Kayla Ann Young (born July 12, 1988) is an American politician serving as a member of the West Virginia House of Delegates from the 56th district. Elected in November 2020, she assumed office on December 1, 2020.

Education 
Young earned a Bachelor of Arts degree in interdisciplinary studies and a Master of Science in integrated marketing from West Virginia University.

Career 
Prior to entering politics, Young founded small businesses and non-profit organizations. She also worked in government relations for the West Virginia Environmental Council. She was elected to the West Virginia House of Delegates in November 2020 and assumed office on December 1, 2020. She also served as the minority vice chair of the House Agriculture and Natural Resources Committee and House Small Business, Entrepreneurship, and Economic Development Committee.

References 

Living people
Women state legislators in West Virginia
West Virginia University alumni
Democratic Party members of the West Virginia House of Delegates
People from South Charleston, West Virginia
21st-century American women politicians
1988 births
21st-century American politicians